Arimadanapura Palace is a royal palace in Bagan, Myanmar. It was reconstructed in 2008.

References

Palaces in Myanmar
Buildings and structures in Mandalay Region